Frederick John Landeg  (born 1948) was the Chief Veterinary Officer (CVO) of the United Kingdom and for Department for Environment, Food and Rural Affairs (DEFRA), from November 2007 to April 2008.

Landeg was born in 1948, and educated at Sir Walter St. John's School. He graduated from the Royal Veterinary College in 1971 and practiced as a veterinary surgeon until 1975, when he became a Veterinary Officer at the Ministry of Agriculture, Fisheries and Food. He became the UK's Deputy Chief Veterinary Officer, and Director General at DEFRA in 2004.

On 9 November 2007, Landeg became the UK's acting Chief Veterinary Officer following the early retirement of Debby Reynolds. On 16 November, he was promoted to the role officially.

Landeg retired in April 2008, and was appointed Commander of the Order of the British Empire (CBE) in the 2008 Birthday Honours. He received his honor from the Queen at Windsor Castle on December 12, 2008.

References

British veterinarians
Commanders of the Order of the British Empire
1948 births
Living people
People educated at Sir Walter St John's Grammar School For Boys
Alumni of the Royal Veterinary College